The coat of arms of Nigeria consists of a black shield with a wavy white pall, symbolizing the meeting of the Niger and Benue Rivers at Lokoja. The black shield represents Nigeria's fertile soil, while the two supporting horses or chargers on each side represent dignity. The eagle represents strength, while the green and white twists of the torse on the top of the shield represent the rich soil.

The red flowers at the base are Costus spectabilis, Nigeria's national flower. This flower was chosen for inclusion in the coat of arms as it is found all over Nigeria and also stand for the beauty of the nation. On the banderole around the base is Nigeria's national motto since 1978: "Unity and Faith, Peace and Progress" (formerly "Peace, Unity, Freedom").

Blazon
Sable a Pall wavy argent, supported by two horses Argent, and set for a crest on a wreath, Argent and Vert, an eagle displayed Gules.

Government Seals

Historical emblems

Sub-national emblems

See also
Nigerian heraldry
Seal of the President of Nigeria
Flag of Nigeria

References

External links
Nigeria Heraldry History

Nigeria
National symbols of Nigeria
Nigerian coats of arms
Nigeria
Nigeria
Nigeria